The African Library Project (ALP) is a non-profit organization that starts libraries in rural Africa.  U.S. volunteers organize book drives and ship books to a library in Africa.  ALP partners with governmental and non-governmental organizations in sub-Saharan Africa. The partners process applications from schools and communities that want libraries, distribute the books, and provide training. Schools and communities that receive books provide the library space and staffing. ALP works in Botswana, Ghana, Kenya, Lesotho, Malawi, Sierra Leone, and Uganda.

ALP is a US 501(c)(3) organization founded in 2005 by Chris Bradshaw. In the first eleven years of operation, ALP started over 1,900 libraries in sub-Saharan Africa.

Methods of operation 

ALP volunteers in the United States collect used, donated books for later shipment to affiliated libraries in Africa.  The volunteers then sort, pack, and ship the books via sea container, for eventual delivery to a designated African school or community.

A typical small library is one thousand (mostly paperback) books. As of August 2020, the cost of shipping the books to Africa  is about $500: $250 in U.S. domestic postage to mail the books to a consolidation point in New Orleans, Louisiana, and $250 sent to ALP to defray the costs of container shipping.
 
ALP partner organizations are large governmental and non-governmental organizations that vet schools and communities that want libraries. When the containers arrive, they contain books for 30-60 libraries. The partners distribute them and also  provide training and oversight of the libraries.

Teachers and administrators of the target schools are given a manual on managing a library based on one developed by Voluntary Service Overseas (VSO). Librarians collect data on usage and attend training provided by the partners and ALP. Librarians from all the countries where ALP is working meet at the biannual Library Summit to share best practices.
 
Each library requests the specific types of books they need. In addition to the donated books, ALP purchases supplemental books for the libraries: the Junior African Writers Series (JAWS), HIV/AIDS readers (published by Pearson), and Hesperian Health Guides.

References

External links 
African Library Project Home Page

Philanthropic organizations based in the United States
Non-profit organizations based in San Francisco
Charities based in the United States